Playa Baracoa Airport  is an airport west of Havana, Cuba. It is located in the municipality of Caimito, Artemisa Province, in front of the village of Playa Baracoa, belonging to the neighboring municipality of Bauta.

Playa Baracoa Air Base
The airport is an inactive Cuban Revolutionary Armed Forces air base and home to Air Defense Command and VIP transport:

 3710th Interceptor Squadron and Training
 3688 Transport Regiment - using Antonov An-26 transport
 3405 Executive Transport Squadron - Yakovlev Yak-40 VIP jet, Antonov An-26M transport; Mil Mi-8P and Mil Mi-8TB transport helicopters
 3404 Transport Squadron - using Antonov An-2 transport

References

External links
 

Airports in Cuba
Transport in Havana
Buildings and structures in Artemisa Province